Sandra Díaz is a Venezuelan actress and model.

Career 
Díaz first appeared on television at the age of 10, in the children's program of Televen Taima. At 16, she was cast to participate in the telenovela RCTV La trepadora and went to France. In 2009 she was in Calle luna, Calle sol as Valerie Hidalgo Arriaga. From 2012, she recorded Nacer contigo, the first soap opera in high definition made in Venezuela. In 2013, she participated in Las Bandidas, a telenovela produced by RCTV and Televisa. In 2014, she joined the recurring cast of the television series El Señor de los Cielos, produced by Telemundo.

Filmography

References

External links

Living people
Venezuelan telenovela actresses
Venezuelan television actresses
21st-century Venezuelan actresses
Year of birth missing (living people)